Kish is a surname. Notable people with the surname include:

 Ben Kish (1917–1989), American National Football League player
 Daniel Kish (born 1966), American president of World Access for the Blind 
 Eleanor Kish (1924–2014), American artist
 George Kish (1914–1989), American cartographer
 Jen Kish (born 1988), Canadian former rugby union player
 Joseph Kish (1899–1969), American set decorator
 Justine Kish (Svetlana Nasibulina, born 1988), American mixed martial artist 
 Larry Kish (born 1941), Canadian former National Hockey League head coach
 Laszlo B. Kish (born 1955), Hungarian-born American physicist
 Leslie Kish (1910–2000), Hungarian-American statistician and survey methodologist
 Nehemiah Kish (born c. 1980), American retired ballet dancer